Pakhribas is an urban municipality out of three urban municipalities located in Dhankuta District of Province No. 1 of Nepal. Pakhribas municipality established on 2 December 2014 merging following VDCs: Pakhribas, Sanne, Phalate, Ghorlikharka and Muga.

When Government of Nepal decided to reduce local level body in 753 units, all previous VDCs nullified and merged them with either existed Municipalities or created new Municipality, so Chungmang VDC merged with Pakhribas on 10 March 2017.

The municipality is divided into total 10 wards.

Demographics
At the time of the 2011 Nepal census, Pakhribas Municipality had a population of 22,078. Of these, 53.8% spoke Nepali, 14.4% Tamang, 13.4% Magar, 8.8% Rai, 3.1% Bantawa, 1.3% Phangduwali, 0.9% Gurung, 0.7% Limbu, 0.7% Yakkha and 2.5% other languages as their first language.

In terms of ethnicity/caste, 27.2% were Chhetri, 16.4% Rai, 16.0% Tamang, 13.9% Magar, 5.8% Hill Brahmin, 4.7% Kami, 3.6% Newar, 2.4% Damai/Dholi, 2.0% Gharti/Bhujel and 8.0% others.

In terms of religion, 59.8% were Hindu, 26.3% Buddhist, 12.8% Kirati, 1.0% Christian and 0.1% others.

Twin towns – sister cities 

 Kathmandu

History Of Pakhribas

Pakhribas VDC
Pakhribas  was a village development committee in Dhankuta District in the Kosi Zone of EDR before 2014. At the time of the 1991 Nepal census it had a population of 4508 people living in 890 individual households.
One story says that Pakhribas got its name from a Pakhri tree which used to stand at the center of the present day Pakhribas Bazaar some decades ago. The porters, transporting goods to Bhojpur and Sankhuwasabha, usually rested under the Pakhri tree and referred to the tree as their baas (lodge) for the night. Hence, the name Pakhribas.
Pakhribas has 9 schools, among which three are private schools(Sheetala Devi English Secondary School at Pakhribas-7, Sayapatri English Medium School and Dibyajyoti English School at Pakhribas-3). Jalapa Devi Higher Secondary School provides higher education in science, humanities and arts faculty. Jalapa also has CTEVT annexed sub-overseer course.
Pakhribas has three prominent Hindu shrines, one Buddhist monastery and two churches. The churches belong to the Protestant faith. Aashish Church situated in Pakhribas-8 is supposed to be the first of its kind in the Free Presbyterian faith.

Pakhribas Municipality
Nowadays Pakhribas is a municipality.

Architecture and cityscape

Pakhribas Bazar

Agricultural Research Center

Municipalities Information systems

Belbari Municipality is currently divided into 10 Wards.

Education
 College of Natural Resources Management (CNRM)
 Ram Madhyamik Biddhyalay, Muga
 Jalapa Madhyamik Biddhyalay, Pakhribas
 Amar Madhyamik Biddhyalay, Falate

Divisions
Pakhribas Municipality is divided into different formal VDC.

Local Election

Local Level Election 2074 

Not Available

Local Level Election 2079

Notable people 
 Surya Bahadur Thapa
 Sunil Thapa

References

External links

Populated places in Dhankuta District
Municipalities in Koshi Province
Nepal municipalities established in 2014
Municipalities in Dhankuta District